Angustibacter peucedani is a Gram-positive and strictly aerobic bacterium from the genus of Angustibacter which has been isolated from rhizospheric soil from the plant Peucedanum japonicum from Mara Island in Korea.

References

Bacteria described in 2013
Actinomycetia